Sculptolumina is a genus of corticolous lichens in the family Caliciaceae. The genus was circumscribed by Bernhard Marbach in 2000, with Sculptolumina japonica designated as the type species.

Species
Sculptolumina conradiae  (2014)
Sculptolumina coreana  (2019) – Korea
Sculptolumina japonica  (2000)
Sculptolumina ramboldii  (2018) – Australia
Sculptolumina serotina  (2000)
Sculptolumina yunnanensis  (2019) – China

References

Caliciales
Caliciales genera
Taxa described in 2000